Ali Blythe is a Canadian poet and editor. His debut poetry collection Twoism was a shortlisted finalist for the Dorothy Livesay Poetry Prize in 2016, and he was a finalist for the 2017 Dayne Ogilvie Prize for LGBTQ writers.

A graduate of the University of Victoria, he is the former editor of the literary magazineThe Claremont Review. He also completed a residency at the Banff Center.

His newest poetry book, Hymnswitch, was published in March 2019. He lives in Victoria, British Columbia.

References

21st-century Canadian poets
Canadian male poets
Canadian magazine editors
Canadian LGBT poets
Transgender men
Canadian transgender writers
Writers from Vancouver
University of Victoria alumni
Living people
21st-century Canadian male writers
Year of birth missing (living people)
21st-century Canadian LGBT people
Transgender poets